Cameron "Cammie" Boyle was a Scottish international rugby union player.

He was capped for  three times in 1963. He also played for London Scottish FC.

His brother Alasdair Boyle was also capped for Scotland.

References
 Bath, Richard (ed.) The Scotland Rugby Miscellany (Vision Sports Publishing Ltd, 2007 )

Scottish rugby union players
Scotland international rugby union players
Living people
Year of birth missing (living people)